Sissonne is a commune in the Aisne department in Hauts-de-France in northern France. It is about 20 km east of Laon, close to the source of the river Souche.

The community dates back to the 12th century with the first church built c.1107.

The sculptor and engraver Guillaume Dupré was born at Sissonne c.1576.

There has been a military camp at Sissonne since 1895, with British and German military cemeteries from World War I nearby.

The politician Nicolas Fricoteaux was born at Sissonne in 1962.

Population

See also
 Communes of the Aisne department

References

Communes of Aisne